Season 2001–02 was the 118th football season in which Dumbarton competed at a Scottish national level, entering the Scottish Football League for the 96th time, the Scottish Cup for the 107th time, the Scottish League Cup for the 55th time and the Scottish Challenge Cup for the 11th time.

Overview 
Season 2001-02 began with a sense of confidence - this would be the first full season at the new home ground and followed the appointment of Tom Carson as manager which brought about a change of fortunes to Dumbarton's campaign the previous season. The league season itself would be full of ups and downs but in the end it came down to the final game against one of their oldest opponents, Queen's Park.  A draw would be sufficient to gain a promotion place, but at 1-1 in stoppage time, Queen's Park were awarded a soft penalty.  Fortunes were on Dumbarton's side however, as John Wight made a magnificent save and promotion was secured.

In Scottish Cup, Dumbarton lost out to Alloa Athletic in the first round.

In the League Cup, an excellent win over near neighbours Clydebank was followed by a second round exit to Premier Division Dundee United.

Finally, in the Scottish Challenge Cup, Dumbarton returned to old habits and lost in their first outing against Ross County.

Locally, in the Stirlingshire Cup, Dumbarton won both of their group ties, and progressed to their first final in six years, but failed in a penalty shoot out against Stenhousemuir.

Results & fixtures

Scottish Third Division

Bell's Challenge Cup

CIS League Cup

Tennent's Scottish Cup

Stirlingshire Cup

League table

Player statistics

Squad 

|}

Transfers

Players in

Players out

Trivia
 The League match against Elgin City on 9 February marked Andy Brown's 100th appearance for Dumbarton in all national competitions - the 122nd Dumbarton player to reach this milestone.

See also
 2001–02 in Scottish football

References

External links
Jon Connolly (Dumbarton Football Club Historical Archive)
John Wight (Dumbarton Football Club Historical Archive)
Scottish Football Historical Archive

Dumbarton F.C. seasons
Scottish football clubs 2001–02 season